Sathria onophasalis is a moth in the family Crambidae. It is found on the Antilles, including Puerto Rico and the Virgin Islands.

References

Moths described in 1859
Spilomelinae